United Nations Security Council Resolution 181, adopted on August 7, 1963, was concerned with an arms build-up by the Republic of South Africa and fears that those arms might be used to further the racial conflict in that country.  The Council called upon the government of South Africa to abandon its policy of apartheid, as first requested to by Resolution 134 (1960), and called upon all states to voluntarily cease the sale and shipment of all arms, ammunition and other military equipment to South Africa.

The resolution was adopted by nine votes to none; France and the United Kingdom abstained. However, the resolution had little immediate effect on the conduct of the regime in South Africa.

See also
List of United Nations Security Council Resolutions 101 to 200 (1953–1965)
International sanctions during apartheid

References

External links
 
Text of the Resolution at undocs.org
 Resolution 181

United Nations Security Council Resolution 181
 0181
 0181
August 1963 events